Boa Vista or Boavista (Portuguese meaning "good view") may refer to:

Places
Brazil
 Boa Vista, Paraíba
 Boa Vista, neighborhood in Porto Alegre, Rio Grande do Sul
 Boa Vista, Roraima
 Boa Vista International Airport
 Boa Vista Air Force Base
 Boa Vista da Aparecida, Paraná
 Boa Vista das Missões, Rio Grande do Sul
 Boa Vista do Buricá, Rio Grande do Sul
 Boa Vista do Cadeado, Rio Grande do Sul
 Boa Vista do Gurupi, Maranhão
 Boa Vista do Incra, Rio Grande do Sul
 Boa Vista do Ramos, Amazonas
 Boa Vista do Sul, Rio Grande do Sul
 Boa Vista do Tupim, Bahia

Cape Verde
 Boa Vista, Cape Verde, one of the Barlavento Islands of Cape Verde
 Boa Vista, Cape Verde (municipality), a municipality encompassing the whole island

Sports
 Boavista (cycling team), a Portuguese cycling team based in Porto
 Boavista (futsal), an amateur futsal team based in Porto, Portugal
 Boavista F.C., a prominent Portuguese football club in the city of Porto
 Boavista FC (Cape Verde), a Capeverdean football club
 Boavista Sport Club, a Brazilian football club
 Circuito da Boavista, a Formula 1 racetrack in the city of Porto

Other uses
 Boa Vista (literary magazine), founded in Hamburg, Germany in 1974 and published until 1983
 Boa Vista, Angola, a railway station; see Railway stations in Angola
 Boa Vista FM, an FM radio station broadcasting variety and pop at 96.3 FM in Paracatu, Minas Gerais, Brazil
 Natalia Boa Vista, a character on the television show CSI: Miami
 , a ferry in service 2001-07

See also 
 Bonavista (disambiguation)
 Buena Vista (disambiguation)
 Buenavista (disambiguation)
 Buona Vista (disambiguation)